Charlotte Russe is an American clothing retail chain store that operates in the United States, headquartered in San Francisco, California. Fashions in the stores are targeted at women in their teens and twenties. , Charlotte Russe operates 135 stores, mostly in malls and shopping centers.

History

Charlotte Russe was founded in 1975 by Daniel Lawrence and his two brothers, all who worked in their family's Brooklyn, New York clothing business. Lawrence and his siblings formed Lawrence Merchandising Corp. in Carlsbad, California. With the first Charlotte Russe storefront in San Diego, California, other locations were established throughout the 1970s and early 1980s.

The company was acquired in 1996 by the investment firm of SKM (Saunders Karp & Megrue). The new owners had expansion plans for Charlotte Russe - evolving it into a national chain of shopping mall stores. SKM took Charlotte Russe public in 1999 until Advent International acquired it in 2009. As President and CEO, Jenny Ming led Charlotte Russe into a private holding once again.

It filed for Chapter 11 bankruptcy on February 4, 2019. In April 2019 the brand was bought by Toronto-based YM Inc., according to a press release.

In November 22, 2019 there were 135 stores with additional planned.

Important dates

1975: Lawrence brothers open first Charlotte Russe store, in Carlsbad, California.
1990: Charlotte Russe moves into Arizona.
1992: Company expands into Nevada.
1994: Clothing manufacturer Rampage Clothing Co. opens first retail outlet.
1996: Investment firm SKM buys Charlotte Russe.
1997: Company buys Rampage, with 15 stores nationwide.
1999: Charlotte Russe Holding goes public.
2019: Charlotte Russe filed for Chapter 11 bankruptcy
2019: Charlotte Russe, is purchased by YM Inc

See also
 Retail apocalypse
 List of retailers affected by the retail apocalypse

References

External links
 
Bankruptcy website

Clothing brands of the United States
Clothing retailers of the United States
Companies based in San Diego
Companies that filed for Chapter 11 bankruptcy in 2019
Retail companies established in 1975
Retail companies disestablished in 2019
1975 establishments in California
2019 disestablishments in California
American companies established in 1975
American companies disestablished in 2019
Clothing companies established in 1975
Clothing companies disestablished in 2019